Jakob Stausholm is a Danish businessman, and the CEO of Rio Tinto Group since January 2021.

Stausholm earned a degree from the University of Copenhagen.

Stausholm joined Rio Tinto in September 2018 as an executive director and chief financial officer (CFO). He succeeded Jean-Sébastien Jacques as CEO on 1 January 2021.

Before Rio Tinto, Stausholm was the Chief Strategy, Finance and Transformation Officer for Maersk. Prior to this, Stausholm worked for Shell for 19 years.

References

Living people
People of Rio Tinto (corporation)
University of Copenhagen alumni
Maersk people
Year of birth missing (living people)